The Giro della Provincia di Siracusa was a single-day road cycling held annually in the Province of Syracuse in Sicily. Five editions of the race were held, from 1998 to 2002. Reserved for professional cyclists, it was part of the UCI calendar as a class 1.3 race.

Winners

References

Cycle races in Italy
Recurring sporting events established in 1998
Recurring sporting events disestablished in 2002
1998 establishments in Italy
Defunct cycling races in Italy